The following railroads operate in the U.S. state of Arkansas.

Class I railroads
BNSF Railway (BNSF)
Kansas City Southern Railway (KCS)
Union Pacific Railroad (UP)

Regional railroads
Missouri and Northern Arkansas Railroad (MNA)

Shortline and terminal railroads
Arkansas, Louisiana and Mississippi Railroad (ALM)
Arkansas Midland Railroad (AKMD)
Arkansas and Missouri Railroad (AM)
Arkansas Southern Railroad (ARS)
Camden and Southern Railroad (CSR)
Dardanelle and Russellville Railroad (DR)
Delta Valley and Southern Railway (DVS)
De Queen and Eastern Railroad (DQE)
East Camden and Highland Railroad (EACH)
El Dorado and Wesson Railway (EDW)
Fordyce and Princeton Railroad (FP)
Fort Smith Railroad (FSR)
Kiamichi Railroad (KRR)
Little Rock Port Authority Railroad (LRPA)
Little Rock and Western Railway (LRWN)
Louisiana and North West Railroad (LNW)
North Louisiana and Arkansas Railroad (NLA)
Ouachita Railroad (OUCH)
Prescott and Northwestern Railroad (PNW)
Warren and Saline River Railroad (WSR)
West Memphis Base Railroad (WMBR)

Passenger railroads

Amtrak (AMTK): Texas Eagle

Heritage and scenic railroads
Northwestern Arkansas A&M Excursion
Eureka Springs and North Arkansas Railway
Fort Smith Trolley Museum

Industrial rail operations
Bauxite and Northern Railway (BXN)
Granite Mountain Quarries Railroad (GMQX)

Defunct railroads

Electric
Inter-City Terminal Railway

Notes

References

Further reading
 Arkansas State Highway and Transportation Department (May 2002), . Retrieved February 11, 2005.
 
 Hull, Clifton E. (1988) Shortline Railroads of Arkansas, University of Central Arkansas Press, Conway, Arkansas.  

 
Railroads
Arkansas